Noël van Klaveren (born 27 November 1995 in Alphen aan den Rijn) is a Dutch artistic gymnast. She won a silver medal on vault at the 2013 European Championships. She is also the current Dutch national vault champion.

Competitive History

References

1995 births
Living people
Dutch female artistic gymnasts
Sportspeople from Alphen aan den Rijn